Indigo Wireless is a regional wireless telecommunications company in northern Pennsylvania. Based in Wellsboro, Indigo is often the only provider of service in its coverage area and is a local roaming partner for both AT&T and T-Mobile.

Network
Indigo's wireless network includes EDGE and GPRS data technology as well as UMTS. Both the 2G and 3G networks are run on the Cellular 850 MHz band due to the mountainous terrain of northern Pennsylvania. Indigo also holds PCS 1900 MHz licenses in the majority of its coverage area and uses it to provide GSM or LTE fixed wireless internet depending on location. Their website advertises them as having the most towers in Tioga County, where they are based.

Roaming
Customers of many different providers can freely roam onto Indigo's GSM and UMTS networks and have access to full voice and data services depending on the roaming agreement. Indigo is a member of the GSMA and maintains many domestic and international roaming agreements with a variety of partner networks.

History
In 1991, Indigo Wireless started as the Americell PA-3 Partnership. It acquired the FCC license to serve Rural Service Area PA-3 in Potter, Clinton, and Tioga Counties. In 1992, Indigo received $8 million to create a cellular network in Northern PA. It built a telecommunications switch in Lock Haven, Clinton County, PA and launched service there. In 1993,  turned on the first cellular service in Tioga County by building a tower in Mansfield, PA. It also started selling service to residents of Tioga under the name Cellular One of Tioga. Their network was analog at the time. 1994 brought on the first roaming agreements for Indigo. It got agreements with 300 other service providers in the US and Canada so its customers could travel with their phones outside of northern PA. In 1997, Indigo (CellOne of Tioga) started upgrading their network to digital. Indigo's digital service rollout in the RSA PA-3 area happened before many Pennsylvania cities, such as Harrisburg, even got basic digital service. In 2000, after AT&T had left the Cellular One group and Southwestern Bell and Bell South had left in order to become Cingular Wireless, Indigo finally changed its name from Cellular One of Tioga to Indigo Wireless. 2003 gave Indigo licenses to operate in Bradford, Sullivan, and Wyoming counties after working closely with AT&T Wireless. In 2004, Indigo began upgrading to GSM in every area it covered. This new use of GSM technology allowed Indigo customers to use data on their phones and computers via the Indigo network. Indigo Wireless is still the only GSM provider in parts of northern PA and continues to provide service to customers from other carriers who roam onto their network.

In late 2010, Indigo began offering high-speed broadband Internet service to residents of Tioga County utilizing fixed point-to-multipoint wireless equipment from Ubiquiti Networks. This equipment has the capabilities to provide service speeds of over 1 Gbit/s of Internet service to resident and businesses throughout the coverage area.  Services are being marked and sold under the Xtreme Internet name Indigo also offers residential and business internet through its 3G and LTE networks.

References

Mobile phone companies of the United States